Beecroft may refer to:
Beecroft, New South Wales, a suburb of Sydney, Australia
Beecroft railway station
Beecroft Primary School
Beecroft Peninsula, landform on the south coast of New South Wales, Australia
Beecroft Art Gallery, Southend-on-sea, Essex, England
Beecroft's Toys, an online and mail order toy shop

People with the surname
Adrian Beecroft, British venture capitalist and Conservative Party adviser
David Beecroft, American actor
Emily Beecroft, Australian swimmer
John Beecroft (1790–1854), British explorer and administrator
Robert Beecroft, American diplomat
Vanessa Beecroft, Italian artist living in New York
Ben Beecroft, New Zealand cricketer